Reason is the second studio album by the Brazilian heavy metal band Shaman, first released in 2005. "Innocence" was released as the band's first single.

Track listing
All lyrics are written by André Matos, except "More" (lyrics by Andrew Eldritch).

Personnel
Shaaman
 André Matos – vocals, piano, keyboards
 Hugo Mariutti – guitars
 Luís Mariutti – bass
 Ricardo Confessori – drums

Additional personnel
 Miro – keyboard arrangements and programming, sound effects
 Junior Rossetti – keyboards, sound effects
 Fabio Ribeiro – organ
 Marcus Viana – violin, cello, Indian dioruba, rabbab
 Helder Araujo – sitar, tablas
 Amanda Somerville – backing vocals, narration, vocal coaching
 The São Paulo State Symphony Ensamble:
 Svetlana Terechkova, Andrea Campos Misiuk, Soraya Landim, Matthew Thomas Thorpe, Camila Tamae Yasuca, Cesar Augusto Miranda – violins
 Svetlana Bogatyreva, Tania Campos Kier – violas
 Douglas Kier, Wilson Sampaio – cellos

Production
Sascha Paeth – producer, engineer, mixing, mastering
Philip Colodetti – co-producer, engineer, mastering
Glenn Zolotar, Ricardo Nagata, Luizinho Mazzei, Eduardo Avellar, Evandro Lopez – engineers

References

2005 albums
Shaman (Brazilian band) albums
AFM Records albums